California Township is one of 22 townships in Faulkner County, Arkansas, USA. As of the 2000 census, its unincorporated population was 1,467. The township experienced much unusual geologic activity with the Guy-Greenbrier earthquake swarm in 2010–2011.

Geography
Woolly Hollow State Park is in the southeast corner of the township.

Cities, towns, villages
Guy
Old Texas (unincorporated)
Rowlett (historical)

Cemeteries
The township contains Copperas Springs Cemetery, King Cemetery, McNew Cemetery, Mode Cemetery, and Old Texas Cemetery.

Major routes
The township contains Arkansas Highway 25, Arkansas Highway 310, and Arkansas Highway 285. A very brief portion of U.S. Route 65 runs in the southwest corner of the township.

References
 United States Census Bureau 2008 TIGER/Line Shapefiles
 United States Board on Geographic Names (GNIS)
 United States National Atlas

External links
 US-Counties.com
 City-Data.com

Townships in Faulkner County, Arkansas
Townships in Arkansas